The Military Collegium of the Supreme Court of Russia is a special military tribunal subordinated to the Supreme Court and is directly by a higher tribunal in relation to the district (naval) military courts.

Powers

Military collegium is considering in the first instance:

cases on challenging non-normative President of Russian Federation, normative acts of the Russian Federation, the Russian Ministry of Defense, other federal bodies of executive power, in which federal law provides for military service on the rights, freedoms and legitimate interests of servicemen, citizens undergoing military training;
cases of crimes committed which accused the judge of the military court, if they declared a petition, as well as crimes of particular complexity of the case or of special public importance that the Military Collegium of the right to take to its production in the presence of the petition of the accused;
case on claims for compensation for the violation of the right to trial within a reasonable time, or right in the performance of a judicial act within a reasonable time in cases under the jurisdiction of the district (naval) military courts.
 considers cases upon complaints and protests against decisions, verdicts, decisions and rulings of the district (naval) military courts, undertaken in the first instance and not yet effective.
hears cases on appeals against decisions, verdicts, decisions and rulings of the military courts, have entered into force.
hears cases on newly discovered evidence in respect of the decisions and judgments of the Military Collegium, which entered into force.
Cases of complaints and protests against decisions, verdicts, decisions and rulings of the Military Collegium accepted it in the first instance and have not entered into force, considers the Appellate Division of the Supreme Court of the Russian Federation.
Cases of protests against decisions, verdicts, decisions and rulings of the Military Collegium of the Supreme Court and the military courts, have entered into force, considering the Presidium of the Supreme Court.

Organization
Military collegium is composed of the chairman, his deputy, chairmen of judicial structures and the other judges of the Supreme Court. The Military Collegium of the judicial panels may be formed. Chairman of the Military Collegium of the Supreme Court is the Deputy President of the Supreme Court and shall be appointed by the Council of Federation of the Federal Assembly of the Russian Federation on the proposal of the President of the Russian Federation, based on the representation of the President of the Supreme Court of the Russian Federation and the conclusion of the qualifying board of judges of the Supreme Court.

Military board publishes a newsletter military courts, which publishes decisions of military courts in civil and criminal cases, judicial review, analysis and statistics on the work of the military courts, as well as other materials.

Further reading
Федеральный конституционный закон от 23 июня 1999 г. N 1-ФКЗ «О военных судах Российской Федерации»

References

Government of Russia
Law of Russia
Judiciary of Russia
Courts in Russia